Lyncina carneola, common name the carnelian cowrie, is a species of sea snail, a cowry, a marine gastropod mollusk in the family Cypraeidae, the cowries.

Description
 These cowries reach  in length. Their shape is rounded and the basic color is a pale orange-brown, with some transverse bands.

Distribution

This species occurs in the seas off Aldabra, Chagos, the Comores, the East Coast of South Africa, Eritrea, Kenya, Madagascar, the Mascarene Basin, Mauritius, Mozambique, the Red Sea, Réunion, the Seychelles, Somalia and Tanzania.

References

 Fishelson, L., 1971. Ecology and distribution of the benthic fauna in the shallow waters of the Red Sea. Mar. Biol., Berl. 10 2: 113–133

External links
 

Cypraeidae
Gastropods described in 1758
Taxa named by Carl Linnaeus